List of schools, colleges and universities in Greater Moncton, New Brunswick, Canada.

Post-secondary education

Universities
 Université de Moncton - The largest French language university in Canada outside of Quebec. Enrollment is in the vicinity of 6200 students. U de M is a comprehensive university with a wide variety of undergraduate and post graduate degree programs including a School of Law.
 Crandall University - A private Christian liberal arts and science institution, affiliated with the Convention of Atlantic Baptist Churches. Enrollment is less than 1000 students. Degrees are available in arts, science, education, business and religious studies.
 University of New Brunswick - UNB Moncton consists of a small health sciences campus located next to the Moncton Hospital. Degree courses are available in Nursing and Medical X-ray Technology. UNB's main campus is located in Fredericton, with another large campus in Saint John.

Community colleges
 New Brunswick Community College - Moncton - (English), The largest campus in the NBCC system with an enrollment of about 4000. Specializes in training for the trades and technology.
 CCNB-Dieppe - (French), mandated to provide training in the trades and technology in the French language. Enrollment of about 2500.

Private colleges
 Eastern College - Formerly known as CompuCollege, it is a nationally recognized educational institution celebrating over 20 years in Atlantic Canada, with five campuses in Fredericton, Saint John, Moncton, Halifax, and St. John’s (Eastern Academy). 

Offering programs in health care, business, information technology, interior decorating, criminology, public relations, child and youth care, office administration, travel and tourism, health and wellness, massage therapy, makeup artistry, and more.
 Moncton Flight College - One of Canada's oldest and most prestigious flight schools, is also the largest flight school in Canada.
 McKenzie College - A Visual Arts institution, specializing in graphic design, digital media and animation.
 Oulton College - A variety of business, paramedical and paralegal programs.

Private elementary schools
 Kingswood Academy Montessori School & Early Learning Centre/ Kingswood Academy - (English)(French), Offers private Montessori education for levels K to Grade Eight, as well as Day Care, After School Care, and Summer Camps.
 Rhema Christian School - Private Christian school.  Offers the lowest tuition costs of any private school in the region.  With small classrooms and individual attention.  Available K-12.

Public school system

Schools in the area
 École Amirault - Dieppe (K-2)
 École Saint-Therèse - Dieppe (K-2)
 École Champlain - Moncton (K-8)
 École Le Sommet - Moncton (K-8)
 École Saint-Henri - Moncton (K-5)
 École Le Mascaret - Moncton (6-8)
 École Sainte-Bernadette - Moncton (K-5)
 École Abbey-Landry - Memramcook (K-8)
 École Anna-Malenfant - Dieppe (3-5)
 École Carrefour de l'Acadie - Dieppe (6-8)
 École Le Marais - Dieppe (3-5)
 École Antonine-Maillet - Dieppe (6-8)
 École Mathieu-Martin - Dieppe (9-12)
 École L'Odyssée - Moncton (9-12)
 Uplands School - Moncton (K-3)
 Forest Glen School - Moncton (K-4)
 Arnold H. MacLeod School - Moncton (K-4)
 Salem Elementary School - Sackville (K-4)
 Salisbury Elementary School - Salisbury (K-4)
 Claude D. Taylor School - Riverview (K-5)
 Frank L. Bowser School - Riverview (K-5)
 Gunningsville School - Riverview (K-5)
 West Riverview School - Riverview (K-5)
 Hillsborough Elementary School - Hillsborough (K-5)
 Mountain View School - Irishtown (K-5)
 Lower Coverdale School - Lower Coverdale (K-5)
 Northrop Frye School - Moncton (K-8)
 Lou MacNarin School - Dieppe (K-8)
 Dorchester Consolidated School - Dorchester (K-8)
 Havelock School - Havelock (K-8)
 Port Elgin Regional School - Port Elgin (K-8)
 Riverside Consolidated School - Riverside-Albert (K-8)
 Shediac Cape School - Shediac (K-8)
 Magnetic Hill School - Lutes Mountain (K-8)
 Beaverbrook School - Moncton (K-8)
 Bessborough School - Moncton (K-8)
 Birchmount School - Moncton (K-8)
 Edith Cavell School - Moncton (K-8)
 Evergreen Park School - Moncton (K-8)
 Hillcrest School - Moncton (K-8)
 Queen Elizabeth School - Moncton (K-8)
 Lewisville Middle School - Moncton (5-8)
 Sunny Brae Middle School - Moncton (5-8)
 Riverview Middle School - Riverview (6-8)
 Marshview Middle School - Sackville (5-8)
 Petitcodiac Regional School - Petitcodiac (K-12)
 Caledonia Regional High School - Hillsborough (6-12)
 Salisbury Middle School - Salisbury (5-8)
 JMA Armstrong High School - Salisbury (9-12)
 Harrison Trimble High School - Moncton (9-12)
 Bernice MacNaughton High School - Moncton (9-12)
 Moncton High School - Moncton (9-12)
 Riverview High School - Riverview (9-12)
 Tantramar Regional High School - Sackville (9-12)
École Acadieville - Acadieville (K-8)
École Dr-Marguerit-Michaud - Bouctouche (K-8)
École Donat-Robichaud - Cap-Pelé (K-8)
École Blanche-Bourgeois - Cocagne (K-8)
École Père-Edgar-T.-LeBlanc - Grand-Barachois (K-8)
École Grande-Digue - Grande-Digue (K-8)
École Notre-Dame - Notre-Dame (K-8)
École Soleil Levant - Richibucto (K-8)
École W.-F. Boisvert - Rogersville (K-6)
École Camille-Vautour - Saint-Antoine (K-8)
École Marée Montante - Saint-Louis-de-Kent (K-8)
École Saint-Paul - Saint-Paul (K-8)
École Calixte-F.-Savoie - Sainte-Anne-de-Kent (K-8)
École Mont-Carmel - Sainte-Marie-de-Kent (K-8)
École Mgr-François-Bourgeois - Shediac (K-8)
École Régionale de Baie Sainte-Anne - Baie-Sainte-Anne (K-12)
École Clement-Cormier - Bouctouche (9-12)
École Carrefour Beausoleil - Miramichi (K-12)
École Secondaire Assomption - Rogersville (7-12)
École Mgr Marcel-François-Richard - Saint-Louis-de-Kent (9-12)
École Louis-J.-Robichaud - Shediac (9-12)

See also
Higher education in New Brunswick
List of universities in New Brunswick
List of schools in New Brunswick

References

Moncton
 Moncton
Greater Moncton